Habibabad (also Romanized as Ḩabībābād) is a village in Solgi Rural District, Khezel District, Nahavand County, Hamadan Province, Iran. At the 2006 census, its population was 359, in 88 families.

References 

Populated places in Nahavand County